Willem Jacob Luyten (March 7, 1899 – November 21, 1994) was a Dutch-American astronomer.

Life
Jacob Luyten was born in Semarang, Java, at the time part of the Dutch East Indies. His mother was Cornelia M. Francken and his father Jacob Luyten, a teacher of French.

At the age of 11 he observed Halley's Comet, which started his fascination with astronomy. He also had a knack for languages, and eventually could speak nine. In 1912 his family moved back to the Netherlands where he studied astronomy at the University of Amsterdam, receiving his BA in 1918.

He was the first student to earn his PhD (at the age of 22) with Ejnar Hertzsprung at Leiden University. In 1921 he left for the United States where he first worked at the Lick Observatory. From 1923 to 1930  Luyten worked at the Harvard College Observatory eventually working at the observatory's Bloemfontein station. He spent the years 1928–1930 in Bloemfontein, South Africa, where he met Willemina H. Miedema and married her on February 5, 1930.

Upon his return to the United States in 1931, he taught at the University of Minnesota from 1931–1967, then served as astronomer emeritus from 1967 until his death.

Luyten studied the proper motions of stars and discovered many white dwarfs. He also discovered some of the Sun's nearest neighbors, including Luyten's Star as well as the high–proper motion star system Luyten 726-8, which was soon found to contain the remarkable flare star UV Ceti.

He also catalogued 17,000 high-proper motion stars in the Luyten Two-Tenths Arcsecond Catalog. An exoplanet was discovered orbiting one of them, LTT 1445A.

Honors
Awards
James Craig Watson Medal (1964) 
Bruce Medal (1968)
Named after him
Asteroid 1964 Luyten
Luyten's Star

References

External links
 National Academy of Sciences biography
 Willem Jacob Luyten 1968 Bruce Medalist

1899 births
1994 deaths
20th-century Dutch astronomers
20th-century American astronomers
Dutch emigrants to the United States
Harvard University staff
People from Semarang
University of Amsterdam alumni
Leiden University alumni
University of Minnesota faculty
Harvard College Observatory people
Members of the United States National Academy of Sciences
Dutch people of the Dutch East Indies